Unalakleet is a city in Nome Census Area, Alaska, United States, in the western part of the state. At the 2010 census the population was 688, down from 747 in 2000.  Unalakleet is known in the region and around Alaska for its salmon and king crab harvests; the residents rely for much of their diet on caribou, ptarmigan, oogruk (bearded seal), and various salmon species.

Unalakleet is also known for its aesthetic value. It is located next to the Bering Sea and the large, clean Unalakleet River. The landscape also has trees, tundra, and hills behind it.

History
Unalakleet is an adaptation of the Iñupiaq word "Una-la-thliq", which means "from the southern side".

Unalakleet is located at the Norton Sound end of the Unalakleet-Kaltag Portage, an important winter travel route between Norton Sound and the Yukon River. Unalakleet has long been a major trade center between the Athabascan people, who lived in the interior of Alaska, and the Inupiat, who lived on the coast.

In the 1830s Russian explorers and traders came: The Russian-American Company built a trading post here at Unalakleet. In 1898 the United States arranged for Sami reindeer herders from Lapland to be brought to Unalakleet, to work with the people about herding practices. In 1901, the United States Army Signal Corps built a  telegraph line from St. Michael that passed through Unalakleet.

Geography and climate
Unalakleet is located at  (63.878907, -160.789680).

Unalakleet has a subarctic climate (Koppen: Dfc) with considerable maritime influences. Winters are cold and dry. Despite its coastal location it has minimal seasonal lag, and December is the coldest month.

Demographics

Unalakleet first appeared on the 1880 U.S. Census as the unincorporated Inuit village of "Oonalakleet." All 100 of its residents were listed as Inuit. It was listed in the 1890 census as "Unalaklik." Of its 175 residents, 170 were Native, 3 were Creole (mixed Russian & Native), and 2 were White. It was listed again as Unalaklik in 1900 and in 1910 under that name, although the latter census also listed it as spelled Unalakleet. Since 1920, it has been recorded in the censuses as Unalakleet. It was formally incorporated in 1974.

As of the census of 2010, there were 688 people, 225 households, and 172 families residing in the city. The racial makeup of the city was 15.0% White, 0.6% Black or African American, 77.3% Native American, 0.1% from other races, and 6.4% from two or more races.  1.0% of the population were Hispanic or Latino of any race. In 2013 there were 882 people.

There were 224 households, out of which 46.9% had children under the age of 18 living with them, 47.3% were married couples living together, 21.4% had a female householder with no husband present, and 21.9% were non-families. 18.8% of all households were made up of individuals, and 5.4% had someone living alone who was 65 years of age or older.  The average household size was 3.33 and the average family size was 3.82.

The population was spread out, with 37.5% under the age of 18, 6.2% from 18 to 24, 26.6% from 25 to 44, 21.6% from 45 to 64, and 8.2% who were 65 years of age or older.  The median age was 31 years. For every 100 females, there were 114.7 males.  For every 100 females age 18 and over, there were 124.5 males.

The median income for a household in the city was $42,083, and the median income for a family was $45,625. Males had a median income of $41,964 versus $32,500 for females. The per capita income for the city was $15,845.  About 12.5% of families and 11.0% of the population were below the poverty line, including 11.3% of those under age 18 and 10.0% of those age 65 or over.

Role in mushing races
The first musher to reach this checkpoint each year is awarded the Gold Coast Award, which includes $2,500 in gold nuggets. Unalakleet also plays an important role in the Iron Dog snowmobile race.

Education
The Mission Covenant Church of Sweden established a mission in Unalakleet in 1887. The Evangelical Covenant Church later started a boarding high school in 1954. It served students from all over western Alaska until it closed in 1985 due to changing educational practices following establishment of home rule in the 1970s. Most villages in Alaska established local schools, including high schools.

The district office for the Bering Strait School District has been located in Unalakleet since 1983.

Unalakleet's local schools include Unalakleet School, a K-12 school that is internally divided into Unalakleet Elementary, Unalakleet Middle School, and Frank A. Degnan High School. The combined school population of Unalakleet Schools is 195, 180 of whom are full or part Alaska Native.

Unalakleet basketball teams have won 6 State titles (3 by Covenant High and 3 by Frank A. Degnan High). Athletics played at the school include cross-country running, wrestling, mixed-6 volleyball, cross country ski/biathlon, basketball, and Native Youth Olympics.

Unalakleet schools has a Gifted & Talented program.  The school's students also participate in Academic Decathlon, Battle of the Books, as well as other academic programs.

Transportation and law
Unalakleet Airport is a central hub for outlying villages, providing air cargo and air taxi services. It is served by daily airline service to Anchorage by Ravn Alaska, along with frequent cargo services by Everts Air Cargo and Northern Air Cargo. Daily flights to Nome and outlying villages are made by Bering Air, Ryan Air, and Ravn Connect (under Ravn Alaska).

Unalakleet has an Alaska State Troopers station. Its local police department works with local VPOs and VPSOs. A court system serves Unalakleet and surrounding villages.

Healthcare
Unalakleet health services are provided by the Anikkan Inuit Iluaqutaat Sub-Regional Clinic, a division of Norton Sound Health Corporation, based in Nome, Alaska. The clinic has permanent staff including medical providers, certified health aides, behavioral health specialists, and a pharmacist. It also hosts specialists in other fields regularly throughout the year.

Notable people
William E. Beltz (1912–1960), carpenter, politician, lived in Unalakleet
Ticasuk Brown (1904–1982), educator, writer; born and raised in Unalakleet

References

External links
 Subsistence wildlife harvests in five northwest Alaska communities, 2001-2003 : results of a household survey / by Kawerak, Inc., Maniilaq Association, and the Alaska Department of Fish and Game ; by Susan Georgette ... [et al.]. Hosted by Alaska State Publications Program.

Cities in Alaska
Cities in Nome Census Area, Alaska
Populated coastal places in Alaska on the Pacific Ocean
Sámi-American history